Ronja Kemmer ( Schmitt, born 3 May 1989) is a German politician of the Christian Democratic Union (CDU) who has been serving as a member of the Bundestag from the state of Baden-Württemberg since 2014.

Political career 
Following the death of Andreas Schockenhoff, Kemmer took his parliamentary seat in December 2014. She was a member of the Committee on European Affairs before moving to the Committee on Education, Research and Technology Assessment (2018–2021) and the Committee on the Digital Agenda (2018–present). In addition to her committee assignments, she is her parliamentary group’s rapporteur on artificial intelligence.

Other activities 
 German-Israeli Health Forum for Artificial Intelligence (GIHF-AI), Member of the Board of Trustees (since 2022)
 Federal Agency for Disruptive Innovation (SPRIN-D), Member of the Supervisory Board (since 2020)

Political positions
In June 2017, Kemmer voted against Germany's introduction of same-sex marriage.

For the 2021 national elections, Kemmer endorsed Markus Söder as the Christian Democrats' joint candidate to succeed Chancellor Angela Merkel.

Controversy
Amid the COVID-19 pandemic in Germany in 2020, Kemmer was one of three members of her parliamentary group – alongside Wolfgang Stefinger and Christoph Ploß – who became the subject of media scrutiny after they had accepted an invitation to embark on a three-day short trip to Oman; Oman's embassy covered their travel expenses of 5,466 euros each.

Personal life
Kammer has been married to lawyer and fellow CDU politician Fabian Kemmer since 2016.

References

External links 

  
 Bundestag biography 

1989 births
Living people
Members of the Bundestag for Baden-Württemberg
Female members of the Bundestag
21st-century German women politicians
Members of the Bundestag 2021–2025
Members of the Bundestag 2017–2021
Members of the Bundestag 2013–2017
Members of the Bundestag for the Christian Democratic Union of Germany